Kalri is a village in Mianwali District, Punjab, Pakistan. This village is situated at the foothill of the Salt Range. The village of Rikhi is situated nearby.

Kalri is part of the Awankari region. Its population mostly belongs to the Sighaal Awan clan of the Awan tribe. The biggest tribe in Kalri is Enayatkhail consisting about 65% of the population.

The village is served with a boys' high school and a girls' high school. Additionally, the village has a local dispensary. Punjabi is the main language spoken by everyone, but 95% of the people can understand Urdu, the national language of Pakistan.

The village was electrified during the early 1980s. There is also a water supply scheme.
Many people from Kalri work in the goods transportation business. Some inhabitants them serve in the armed forces as well. The wheat crop is the main agricultural product. Kalri is a relatively peaceful
village, when compared to other areas of the Mianwali District.

See also
Ahmed Gul Khel
Namal Valley

Populated places in Mianwali District